Honor Moore is an American writer of poetry, creative nonfiction and plays. She currently teaches at The New School in the MFA program for creative nonfiction, where she is a part-time associate teaching professor. 

The Bishop's Daughter, a memoir of her relationship with her father, Bishop Paul Moore, was named an Editor's Choice by The New York Times, a Favorite Book of 2008 by the Los Angeles Times, and chosen by the National Book Critics Circle as part of their "Good Reads" recommended reading list as well as a finalist for the 2008 National Book Critics Circle Award for Autobiography and Lambda Literary Award for Bisexual Literature.

Biography
Honor Moore was born in 1945 to Jenny Moore and of Bishop Paul Moore. She attended the David Geffen School of Drama at Yale University between 1967 - 1979

Career 
Moore has been poet-in-residence at Wesleyan University and the University of Richmond, visiting professor at the Columbia School of the Arts, and was the Visiting Distinguished Writer in the Nonfiction Writing Program at the University of Iowa. 

She is the author of three collections of poems: Red Shoes, Darling, and Memoir; two works of nonfiction, The White Blackbird and The Bishop's Daughter; and the play Mourning Pictures, which was produced on Broadway and published in The New Women’s Theatre: Ten Plays by Contemporary American Women, which she edited.

Moore has received awards in poetry and playwriting from the National Endowment for the Arts, The New York State Council for the Arts and the Connecticut Commission for the Arts and in 2004 was awarded a Guggenheim Fellowship.

In 2012, Moore served as the prestigious Bedell Distinguished Visiting Professor at the University of Iowa's Nonfiction Writing Program.

She is the editor of Amy Lowell: Selected Poems for the Library of America and co-editor of The Stray Dog Cabaret, A Book of Russian Poems, translated by Paul Schmidt. She teaches in the graduate writing programs at The New School and Columbia University School of the Arts. From 2005 to 2007, she was an off-Broadway theatre critic for The New York Times. She is on the editorial board of the literary magazine The Common, based at Amherst College, and published work in the debut issue.

The Bishop's Daughter, a memoir of her relationship with her father, Bishop Paul Moore, was named an Editor's Choice by The New York Times, a Favorite Book of 2008 by the Los Angeles Times, and chosen by the National Book Critics Circle as part of their "Good Reads" recommended reading list as well as a finalist for the 2008 National Book Critics Circle Award for Autobiography and Lambda Literary Award for Bisexual Literature. In April 2009, the Library of America will published Poems from the Women's Movement, an anthology edited by Honor Moore. A re-issue of The White Blackbird has been published, alongside the paperback release of The Bishop's Daughter.

Her most recent book, Our Revolution: A Mother and Daughter at Midcentury, was released March 2020.

Bibliography
 Our Revolution: A Mother and Daughter at Midcentury" (2019) 
 The Bishop's Daughter: A Memoir (2008)
 Red Shoes - Poems (2005)
 Darling (2001)
 The White Blackbird: A Life of the Painter Margarett Sargent by Her Granddaughter (1996)
 Memoir (1988)

References

External links
 Officuial website
HonorMoore.com (official website)
After Ariel: Celebrating the poetry of the women's movement by Honor Moore in the Boston ReviewMemoir and Poetry by Honor Moore on Poems Out Loud
Audio: Honor Moore reads "Disparu" from the book Red Shoes''
Honor Moore read her poetry at the Poetry of Rage Readings produced in 1974 by the Westbeth Playwrights Feminist Collective.
 See also her theater review "Theater Will Never Be the Same" published 1977 discussing feminist theater, 
 Papers of Honor Moore.Schlesinger Library, Radcliffe Institute, Harvard University.
 2008 Bomb Magazine discussion between Honor Moore & Victoria Redel

Year of birth missing (living people)
Living people
American women poets
Columbia University faculty
American women essayists
American women screenwriters
The New School faculty
Moore family
American women dramatists and playwrights
American memoirists
20th-century American poets
21st-century American essayists
Screenwriters from New York (state)
20th-century American women writers
20th-century American non-fiction writers
21st-century American poets
21st-century American women writers
American women memoirists
21st-century American dramatists and playwrights
Poets from New York (state)
Shortridge High School alumni